Calotes jerdoni, commonly known as the Indo-Chinese forest lizard or Jerdon's forest lizard, is a species of lizard in the family Agamidae. The species is endemic to China and South Asia.

Etymology
The specific name, jerdoni, is in honor of British biologist Thomas C. Jerdon.

Description/Identification
Physical structure: A compressed-bodied lizard. This species resembles Calotes maria in pholidotic (scale) and other characters except that it has 45-57 scales round the body; gular scales much larger than the ventral scales; there is an oblique curved fold covered with small granular scales in front of the shoulders; nuchal crest less prominent; the hind-limb reaches to the eye or not quite so far. Dorsal and lateral scales directed upward.

Color pattern:  Deep-green dorsal coloration with yellow, orange or brown spots, but in many cases can make the body into a dark brown within a few seconds.

Length: Maximum total length (including tail): . Common total length: . Common snout-to-vent length (SVL) : .

Maximum published weight: ? g.

Distribution
Bangladesh, Bhutan, China (W Yunnan, Xizang = Tibet), India (Khasi Hills in Assam & Shillong) and Myanmar.

Vernacular names
Bengali: সবুজ গিরিগিটি (Sabuj girigiti), সবুজ রক্তচোষা।

Bhutanese: tsitsimarm

Burmese: ?

Chinese: ?

English: Green forest lizard, Green garden lizard, Indo-Chinese forest lizard and Jerdon's forest lizard.

Hindi & Assamese: ?

Habit and habitat
Terrestrial & arboreal; diurnal; found in many types of forested land. Prefers dense and bushy hill forest. A skillful and an adept climber, it moves over trees and bushes rather swiftly. It is active during the day time.

Diet
Insectivorous; feeds largely on insects but at times bird-eggs, nestlings, and frogs too are eaten up.

Reproduction
Oviparous; breeding season begins around April when males develop bright coloration in the forebody and begin to chase females. Female digs a small hollow in soft earth and lays 11-23 eggs in it for incubation and safety.

Uses
No known practical uses. Play rolls in ecosystem by eating various types of insects and otherwise.

Threat to humans
Non-venomous and completely harmless to humans.

IUCN threat status
Not Evaluated (NE).

References

Further reading
Annandale N (1905). "Contributions to Oriental Herpetology. Suppl. II. Notes on the Oriental lizards in the Indian Museum, with a list of the species recorded from British India and Ceylon".  J. Proc. Asiatic Soc. Bengal 1 (2): 81–93.
Günther A (1870). "Descriptions of a New Indian Lizard of the Genus Calotes ".  Proc. Zool. Soc. London 1870: 778-779 + Plate XLV. (Calotes jerdoni, new species).

Calotes
Reptiles described in 1870
Taxa named by Albert Günther